The Islamabad Stock Exchange ( or PSX-ISE) was a stock exchange located in Islamabad, Capital Territory, Pakistan. In 2016, it merged with the Pakistan Stock Exchange.

History
Islamabad Stock Exchange (ISE) was incorporated as a guarantee-limited company on 25 October 1989 in Islamabad capital territory with the main object of setting up of a trading and settlement infrastructure, information system, skilled resources, accessibility and a fair and orderly market place that ranks with the best in the world. It was licensed as a stock exchange on 7 January 1992. It started trading in July 1992. ISE has been corportrized and demutualized on August 26, 2015 in terms of Stock Exchanges (Corpotization, Demutualization and Integration) Act, 2012. As a consequence thereof, its name has been changed as Islamabad Stock Exchange Limited. With effect from January 11, 2016 the Islamabad Stock Exchange was integrated with the Karachi Stock Exchange Limited under the Stock Exchanges (Corporatisation, Demutualization and Integration) Act, 2012 to form the Pakistan Stock Exchange Limited.

Trading system
Initially, an outcry method of trading (a method of trading that uses verbal bids and offers in the trading pits) in shares was adopted which was replaced with the automated trading system (a computerized system for matching orders in securities) commonly called “ISE-CTS” in 1997. In the year 2002, ISECTS gave way to “ULTRA TRADE” trading system which is not only very efficient but also has extended trading capacity, internet trading functionality. The computerized trading system has brought about much needed transparency in the securities trading. It has been designed in such a way to provide automatic matching of bids and offers for execution purpose. All orders are treated in strict price and time priority, thus ensuring a pure auction market where no order is overlooked or traded through. In this manner, the best trade is executed and passed on to the participants without human interference. Printed confirmation and status messages are immediately received by a member for each of his order. Remote Trading or Internet Trading has been implemented in ISE on 23 June 2003. Now Brokers can trade from anywhere in the world using remote trading software of ISE with the same robustness as working on the LAN.

Unified trading system
Islamabad Stock Exchange joined hands with Lahore Stock Exchange on 30 April 2007 to establish a Unified Trading Platform to help in bringing increased liquidity in the market, improving price discovery, maximizing transparency, increasing turnover, broadening investor base, curtailing risks and distortions in trade, providing cost effective service to the investing public and enhancing the image of both the Exchanges.

Indexes
On 1 January 2004, ISE launched its own capital weighted index which is ISE-10 index with a base date of Dec 31, 2002 and a value of 1000. Before its launch ISE was using index of KSE-100. ISE also has a price weighted index called ISE Network Index which was launched in November 1996.

ISE Towers

ISE intended to construct a high-rise structure in order to cope with the up-coming demands of stock exchange business. For this purpose, ISE build new building which is properly designed using latest techniques to withstand any natural disasters like the 2005 Kashmir earthquake that lead to the collapse of the high-rise Margalla Towers in Islamabad. ISE tower is a 22-storey building, which makes it the second highest building of Islamabad after the Telecom Tower. Basements have capacity to accommodate three hundred cars at a time. The building also accommodates a plant room for latest HVAC system requirements. Ground floor is allocated for meeting the requirements of banks. Each floor is covered by 6 passenger lifts and one cargo lift along with three stairwells. A central cooling and heating system is provided in the building. The building is also equipped with latest communication and electrical systems. For a safe working environment, properly designed fire fighting system is provided along with the emergency fire exists. It is also the first building in Islamabad to have an LCD screen attached on it. ISE Towers were designed by NESPAK Pvt. Ltd. and the contractors were Habib Rafiq Pvt. Ltd. The construction started in early 2006 and the Towers were completed in April 2009. It was inaugurated by Prime Minister Syed Yousuf Raza Gilani on 31 July 2009.

See also
 List of South Asian stock exchanges

References

External links
 Islamabad Stock Exchange

Economy of Islamabad
Former stock exchanges in Pakistan
1989 establishments in Pakistan
Pakistan Stock Exchange
Pakistani companies established in 1989